Jann Parry is a British ballet critic and writer.  She was ballet critic of The Observer from 1983 to 2004.  Her biography, Different Drummer: a Life of Kenneth MacMillan, was the Society for Theatre Research’s book of the year in 2010.

References

Living people
Ballet critics
British critics
Year of birth missing (living people)